World Down Syndrome Day (WDSD) is marked each year on March 21, beginning in 2006. The 21st day of March (the 3rd month of the year) was selected to signify the uniqueness of the triplication (trisomy) of the 21st chromosome which causes Down syndrome.

Every year on March 21, World Down Syndrome Day is observed to create awareness about Down syndrome. It is a condition in which a child is born with an extra 21st chromosome.

Activities and commemorations 
A common activity is wearing colorful or mismatched socks, to show support for people with Down syndrome.  Socks are shaped somewhat like chromosomes.

An animated short, Freebird, was created to recognize World Down Syndrome Day in 2021.  The film was set to a song, "Freedom" by Jordan Hart, and won the Chicago International Children's Film Festival in 2021.

References

External links

Down Syndrome International website 
United Nations World Down Syndrome Day webpages

Disability observances
Down syndrome
Down
March observances
United Nations days